Thoriosa is a genus of African wandering spiders first described by Eugène Simon in 1910.

Species
 it contains four species:
Thoriosa fulvastra Simon, 1910 (type) – São Tomé and Príncipe, Sierra Leone
Thoriosa spadicea (Simon, 1910) – São Tomé and Príncipe
Thoriosa spinivulva (Simon, 1910) – São Tomé and Príncipe
Thoriosa taurina (Simon, 1910) – São Tomé and Príncipe, Equatorial Guinea (Annobon Is.)

References

Araneomorphae genera
Ctenidae
Spiders of Africa
Taxa named by Eugène Simon